This is a list of members of the second legislature of the Estonian Parliament (Riigikogu) following the 1923 elections (held on 5–7 May 1923). It sat between 31 May 1923 and 14 June 1926, before the next round of elections were held.

Officers 
The following is a list of the Riigikogu's officers during the second legislative session:

Chairmen 
 Jaan Tõnisson, 7 June 1923 – 27 May 1925
 August Rei, from 9 June 1925

First Assistant Chairmen 
 Karl Johannes Virma, 7 June 1923 – 27 November 1924
 Jaan Soots, 27 November 1924 – 16 December 1924
 August Jürima, from 16 December 1924

Second Assistant Chairmen 
 Aleksander Leopold Raudkepp, 7 June 1923 – 27 November 1924
 Karl Johannes Virma, 27 November 1924 – 16 December 1924
 Mihkel Martna, 16 December 1924 – 10 December 1925
 Tõnis Kalbus, 10 June 1925– 15 December 1925
 Johannes-Friedrich Zimmermann, 18 December 1925 – 18 February 1926
 Mihkel Juhkam, from 19 February 1926

Secretary 
 Tõnis Kalbus, 7 June 1923 – 10 June 1925
 Johan Holberg, from 10 June 1925

First Assistant Secretary 
 Oskar Köster, 7 June 1923 – 27 November 1924
 Johan Holberg, 27 November 1924 – 10 June 1925
 Aleksander Leopold Raudkepp, from 10 June 1925

Second Assistant Secretary 
 Jaan Vain, 7 June 1923 – 27 November 1924
 Jaan Piiskar, from 27 November 1924

List of members 
Sources:

References

Further information 
 "II Riigikogu koosseis [Composition of the second Riigikogu]", Riigikogu (in Estonian).

2nd